Morghdari-e Sang-e Sefidi (also Romanized as Morgh-dārī-e Sang-e Sefīdī) is a village in Ruin Rural District, in the Central District of Esfarayen County, North Khorasan Province, Iran. At the 2006 census, its population was 7, in 4 families.

References 

Populated places in Esfarayen County